Nova TV is a Live TV streaming service owned and operated by Nova. It has live programming from the major broadcast and cable brands in Iceland.

The streaming service is available to all residents of Iceland.  It can be streamed via the Nova TV website on computers, or the Nova TV app on smartphones, tablets, Apple TV and Android TV.

References

External links
 Official Site

Television channels in Iceland
Television channels and stations established in 2007